Pustec formerly known as Liqenas (1973–2013), is a village in Pustec Municipality, Korçë County, eastern Albania. Situated on the southwestern shore of Lake Prespa, it is home to much of the Macedonian minority in Albania.

Geography

Pustec is located on the southwestern shore of Lake Prespa and is the nearest village to the island of Maligrad. To the northeast, along the lake, lies Shulin, while in the southeast is the village of Leska.

Pustec and the surrounding region lie within the Prespa National Park.

History 
The village of Pustec was mentioned in the Slepche Beadroll from the 16th century.

The  survey by Dimitar Mishev (D. Brancoff) from 1905 shows that the inhabitants of the village of Pustec were in the bosom of the Bulgarian Exarchate. There were 400 Bulgarian Exarchists in the village.

The French linguist André Mazon in his study on Slavic folklore in Albania from 1936 noted Pustec as a Bulgarian village in the region of Mala Prespa.

In 1939, on behalf of 70 Bulgarian houses in Pusteets, Todor Postalov signed a request by the local Bulgarians to the Bulgarian tsaritsa Giovanna requesting her intervention for the protection of the Bulgarian people in Albania – at that time an Italian protectorate.

In 1973, the official name of the village was changed to Liqenas by the Albanian government. In 2013, however, the original Macedonian name, Pustec, was once again made official.

Demographics
The majority of the population are ethnic Macedonians.

Culture

The village of Pustec is situated near two centuries'-old rock churches. The first, Saint Michael the Archangel, is situated on the Lake Prespa shore. Its oldest frescoes date from the 12th century. The other, St Nicholas, contains only fragments of its original frescoes. Pustec is home to an ethnographic museum, established by Spase Trpo in 2023.

People from Pustec 
Trajan Gjorgjiovski, partisan
Mitre Kolevski, partisan
Edmond Temelko, mayor of Pustec Municipality and president of the Macedonian Party

References

Populated places in Pustec Municipality
Villages in Korçë County
Macedonian communities in Albania